The 2009–10 NCAA Division II men's ice hockey season began on November 3, 2009 and concluded on March 6 of the following year. This was the 28th season of second-tier college ice hockey.

The MASCAC began sponsoring men's ice hockey for the 2009–10 season. Five league members joined with two other schools (who became affiliate members) to form the new conference. Because six of the schools had previously been in ECAC Northeast it caused a realignment within that conference which caused the four Division II schools to formally leave and form Northeast-10's ice hockey division along with two schools from ECAC East. The two teams from ECAC East were members of both conferences from 2009 until 2017 when they left the ECAC East (by then called the New England Hockey Conference).

The Northeast-10 became the first formal Division II conference in men's ice hockey since 1983–84. Because the six teams that comprised the conference already played a tournament and there were no other extant Division II programs (Minnesota–Crookston downgraded its program after 2009) the National Tournament was not restarted. The winner of the Northeast-10 tournament has been the de facto Division II champion since 2010.

Regular season

Standings

See also
 2009–10 NCAA Division I men's ice hockey season
 2009–10 NCAA Division III men's ice hockey season

References

External links

 
NCAA